1997 Kashima Antlers season

Review and events
Kashima Antlers won J.League First Stage.

Competitions

Domestic results

J.League

Emperor's Cup

J.League Cup

Super Cup

International results

Asian Club Championship

Player statistics

 † player(s) joined the team after the opening of this season.

Transfers

In:

Out:

Transfers during the season

In
Toshiyuki Abe (loan return from CFZ do Rio on August)
Takayuki Suzuki (loan return from CFZ do Rio on September)
岩瀬 祐一 (Kashima Antlers youth)
Toshihiro Yahata (Kashima Antlers youth)
渋谷 直樹 (Kashima Antlers youth)
Takuya Nozawa (Kashima Antlers youth)

Out
Hideaki Ozawa
Masaki Ogawa (to Kyoto Purple Sanga)
Toshiyuki Abe (loan to CFZ do Rio on March)
Takayuki Suzuki (loan to CFZ do Rio on March)
岩瀬 祐一 (Kashima Antlers youth)
Toshihiro Yahata (Kashima Antlers youth)
渋谷 直樹 (Kashima Antlers youth)
Takuya Nozawa (Kashima Antlers youth)

Awards
J.League Best XI: Yutaka Akita, Naoki Soma, Bismarck
J.League Rookie of the Year: Atsushi Yanagisawa

References
J.LEAGUE OFFICIAL GUIDE 1997, 1997 
J.LEAGUE OFFICIAL GUIDE 1998, 1996 
J.LEAGUE YEARBOOK 1999, 1999

Other pages
 J. League official site
 Kashima Antlers official site

Kashima Antlers
Kashima Antlers seasons